Samuel Hnanyine (born 1 March 1984) is a soccer player from Tahiti currently playing for A.S. Dragon and for Tahiti national football team.
He was part of the Tahitian squad at the 2013 FIFA Confederations Cup in Brazil.

International goals

References

1984 births
Living people
French Polynesian footballers
Tahiti international footballers
2013 FIFA Confederations Cup players
Association football forwards